La Reina del Sur, is a Spanish-language telenovela based on a novel of the same name by Spanish author Arturo Pérez-Reverte. The series follows Teresa Mendoza's (Kate del Castillo) life in drug trafficking. The series premiered on 28 February 2011, on Telemundo.

In July 2020, Telemundo renewed the series for a third season, which is set to premiere on 18 October 2022.

Series overview

Episode list

Season 1 (2011)

Season 2 (2019)

Season 3 (2022–23)

Special

La Reina del Sur, de película (2019)

References

External links 
 

Lists of Mexican drama television series episodes
Lists of soap opera episodes